Forty Green is the name of more than one hamlet in Buckinghamshire, England:

Forty Green, Bledlow
Forty Green, Marlow
Forty Green, Penn